The Communist Party of Kyrgyzstan is a communist party in Kyrgyzstan. KPK was founded on 21 August 1999, following a split in the Party of Communists of Kyrgyzstan.

KPK did not participate in the 2000 parliamentary elections. It publishes Kommunisty Kyrgyzstana.

The party is affiliated to the Communist Party of the Soviet Union of Oleg Shenin.

References

Kyrgyzstan
Communist parties in Kyrgyzstan
Political parties in Kyrgyzstan
Kyrgyzstan